Judith Martin (née Perlman; born September 13, 1938), better known by the pen name Miss Manners, is an American columnist, author, and etiquette authority.

Early life and career 

Martin is the daughter of Helen and Jacob Perlman, both Jewish. Her father was born in 1898 in Białystok, then part of the Russian Empire, now in Poland.  He immigrated to the United States in 1912. In 1925, he received his doctorate from the University of Wisconsin, in economics. Jacob married Helen Aronson in 1935, and they moved to Washington, D.C., where Martin was born in 1938.

Martin spent a significant part of her childhood in Washington, where she still lives and works, graduating from Jackson-Reed High School Class of 1955. She lived in various foreign capitals as a child, as her father, a United Nations economist, was frequently transferred. Martin graduated from Wellesley College with a degree in English. Before she began the advice column, she was a journalist, covering social events at the White House and embassies; she then became a theater and film critic.

"Miss Manners" 
In 1978, Martin began writing an advice column, which was distributed three and later six times a week by Universal Uclick and carried in more than 200 newspapers worldwide. In the column, she answers etiquette questions contributed by her readers and writes short essays on problems of manners, or clarifies the essential qualities of politeness.

Martin writes about the ideas and intentions underpinning seemingly simple rules, providing a complex and advanced perspective, which she refers to as "heavy etiquette theory". Her columns have been collected in a number of books. In her writings, Martin refers to herself in the third person (e.g., "Miss Manners hopes...").

In a 1995 interview by Virginia Shea, Martin said:

You can deny all you want that there is etiquette, and a lot of people do in everyday life. But if you behave in a way that offends the people you're trying to deal with, they will stop dealing with you...There are plenty of people who say, "We don't care about etiquette, but we can't stand the way so-and-so behaves, and we don't want him around!" Etiquette doesn't have the great sanctions that the law has. But the main sanction we do have is in not dealing with these people and isolating them...

Martin identifies "blatant greed" as the most serious etiquette problem in the United States. The most frequently asked question she receives is how to politely demand cash from potential gift-givers (which she answers by stating that there is no polite way to do this), and the second most common question is how much potential guests must spend on a gift (determined by what the giver can afford, not by the event, relationship, related expenses or other factors).

On August 29, 2013, Martin's children, Nicholas and Jacobina, began sharing credit for her columns.

Other 
Martin was the recipient of a 2005 National Humanities Medal from President George W. Bush. On March 23, 2006, she was a special guest correspondent on The Colbert Report, giving her analysis of the manners with which the White House Press Corps spoke to the President.

Some of Martin's writings were collected and set to music by Dominick Argento in his song cycle Miss Manners on Music.

Since its launch in 2008, Judith Martin has been a contributor for wowOwow, a Web site for women to talk culture, politics, and gossip.

Martin's uncle was economist and labor historian Selig Perlman.

Martin was portrayed by Broadway theatre actress Jessie Mueller in The Post, Steven Spielberg's 2017 movie about the Pentagon Papers.

Books 

 The Name on the White House Floor
 Gilbert (This was subtitled "A Comedy Of Manners," and was a work of fiction.)
 Style and Substance
 Miss Manners' Guide to Excruciatingly Correct Behavior
 Miss Manners Rescues Civilization: From Sexual Harassment, Frivolous Lawsuits, Dissing and Other Lapses in Civility
 Miss Manners on Weddings
 Miss Manners' Guide to a Surprisingly Dignified Wedding with Jacobina Martin
 Miss Manners on Painfully Proper Weddings
 Common Courtesy: In Which Miss Manners Solves the Problem That Baffled Mr.  Jefferson
 Miss Manners' Guide for the Turn-of-the-Millennium
 Miss Manners' Basic Training: Communication
 Miss Manners' Basic Training: The Right Thing To Say
 Miss Manners' Basic Training: Eating
 Miss Manners' Guide to Rearing Perfect Children
 Star-Spangled Manners
 Miss Manners' Guide to Domestic Tranquility: The Authoritative Manual for Every Civilized Household, However Harried
 Miss Manners: A Citizen's Guide to Civility
 No Vulgar Hotel: The Desire and Pursuit of Venice
 Miss Manners Minds Your Business with Nicholas Ivor Martin
 Miss Manners' Guide to Contagious Etiquette with Nicholas Martin and Jacobina Martin

See also 

 Adolph Freiherr Knigge
 Amy Vanderbilt
 Book of the Civilized Man
 Emily Post
 Letitia Baldrige

References

External links 

 Miss Manners (Uexpress)
 American Enterprise interview with Judith Martin
 Judith Martin reviews The Empire Strikes Back
 Judith Martin reviews Superman (1978)
 Judith Martin at the National Press Club
 Judith Martin's Interview with the Commonwealth Club of California
Judith Martin at wowOwow
 Letters to "Miss Manners," 1978-1998. Schlesinger Library, Radcliffe Institute, Harvard University.
 

1938 births
Living people
American advice columnists
American women columnists
American women journalists
Georgetown Day School alumni
Etiquette writers
Illeists
Journalists from Washington, D.C.
Wellesley College alumni
National Humanities Medal recipients
American people of Polish-Jewish descent
21st-century American women